New Haven-style pizza is a style of thin-crust, coal-fired Neapolitan pizza common in and around New Haven, Connecticut. Locally known as apizza (from Neapolitan ’na pizza , "a pizza"), it originated in 1925 at the Frank Pepe Pizzeria Napoletana and is now served in many other pizza restaurants in the area, most notably Sally's Apizza and Modern Apizza. This geographically limited pizza style has been favorably regarded by national critics.

Characteristics
In a New Haven-style pizzeria, a "plain" pizza is a crust, oregano, tomato sauce, and  a little bit of grated pecorino romano cheese. A "plain" New Haven-style pizza may also be called a "tomato pie". Mozzarella is considered a topping.

Pepe's restaurant is credited with inventing the "white clam pie", a pizza of crust, olive oil, oregano, grated cheese, chopped garlic, and fresh littleneck clams. It served littleneck clams on the half shell at the bar, which Pepe later added to the pizza.

What makes New Haven-style pizza distinct is its thin, oblong crust, characteristic charring, chewy texture, and limited use of melting cheeses. It tends to be drier and thinner than, but closely related to, traditional New York-style pizza. Both styles in turn are close descendants of the original Neapolitan pizza.

Baking and serving methods
New Haven-style pizza is traditionally baked in a coal-fired oven at extremely hot temperatures above . It is sold whole rather than by the slice.

Availability
Although most commonly available locally, New Haven-style pizza has begun to spread to other parts of the United States. It has been available in the Italian-American areas of Bridgeport, and other shoreline communities for many years; Frank Pepe's also has a location in Yonkers in the Italian-heavy New York City metro area. New Haven-style has penetrated areas typically not known for large Italian-American populations, including towns in northern and central Connecticut, as well as other cities across the United States.

In media
New Haven pizzerias have often topped best pizza lists.
Henry Winkler, Lyle Lovett,  Chris Murphy and Michael Bolton discuss the history of New Haven Pizza in Gorman Bechard's documentary Pizza: A Love Story. In the film the black char imparted from the ovens is described as adding a smoky barbeque flavor not found elsewhere.

See also

References

Further reading
 Shelton, Jim (July 21, 2002). "You say Sally's, I say Pepe's." New Haven Register. Accessed November 29, 2012.

External links
Documentary about New Haven-style pizza (February 22, 2022)

Pizza in the United States
New England cuisine
Culture of New Haven, Connecticut
Italian-American cuisine
Italian-American culture in Connecticut
Pizza styles